The men's 400 metres event at the 2009 European Athletics U23 Championships was held in Kaunas, Lithuania, at S. Dariaus ir S. Girėno stadionas (Darius and Girėnas Stadium) on 16 and 17 July.

Medalists

Results

Final
17 July

Semifinals
16 July
Qualified: first 4 each to Final

Semifinal 1

Semifinal 2

Heats
16 July
Qualified: first 3 each heat and 4 best to Semifinals

Heat 1

Heat 2

Heat 3

Heat 4

Participation
According to an unofficial count, 26 athletes from 19 countries participated in the event.

 (1)
 (1)
 (1)
 (3)
 (1)
 (1)
 (1)
 (1)
 (1)
 (3)
 (1)
 (1)
 (2)
 (1)
 (1)
 (1)
 (3)
 (1)
 (1)

References

400 metres
400 metres at the European Athletics U23 Championships